Pain Killer is the third studio album by the Swiss hard rock band Krokus, released in 1978. It was recorded at The Manor Studio in Shipton-on-Cherwell, England, and took just six days to produce. 

The album was also released with the title Pay It in Metal, and featured different covers for different regions. In all, five different covers were released, all containing exactly the same tracks.

"Susie" was released as a single, with "Rock Me, Rock You" being the single's b-side.

Track listing

Personnel
Band members
Chris von Rohr - vocals, percussion, drums, bass, keyboards
Tommy Kiefer - lead guitar, vocals
Fernando von Arb - rhythm guitar, bass, keyboards
Jürg Naegeli - bass, keyboards
Freddy Steady - drums, percussion

Production
Harry Sprenger - producer, mixing
Mick Glossop - engineer
Alan Douglas - assistant engineer

References

Krokus (band) albums
1978 albums
Mercury Records albums